Home and Away is an Australian television soap opera. It was first broadcast on the Seven Network on 17 January 1988. The following is a list of characters that first appeared or will appear in 2013, by order of first appearance. All characters are introduced by the soap's executive producer, Lucy Addario. The 26th season of Home and Away began airing from 21 January 2013. The first introduction of the year was Zac MacGuire then followed by Courtney Freeman, Maddy Osborne, Spencer Harrington and Rosie Prichard who all made their debuts in the same month. Chris Harrington and Ricky Sharpe arrived in April. Josh, Andy Barrett and Hannah Wilson debuted in August, while Zac's family – Ethan, Evelyn and Oscar MacGuire – began appearing from September, as did Nate Cooper. Jade Montgomery and Matt Page arrived in October, while Phoebe Nicholson debuted in November.

Zac MacGuire

Zac MacGuire, played by Charlie Clausen, made his first screen appearance on 22 January 2013. The character and casting was announced on 13 January 2013. A TV Week reporter noted that the role marked something of a return to acting for Clausen. The actor commented "I'm very excited to join the cast of Home and Away. I found out I got the role on my birthday and I couldn't think of a better gift. It's a fantastic opportunity for any actor and I've been made to feel really welcome by the cast, crew and production team. I'm looking forward to 2013 and beyond." Zac is a prison education officer who encounters Casey Braxton (Lincoln Younes) when he breaks up a brawl. Clausen revealed that Zac has been asked to keep an eye on Casey by Natalie Davison (Catherine Mack). The actor stated that Zac is "a good guy", who began working in the prison system after spending time inside when he was younger.

Courtney Freeman

Courtney Freeman, played by Joshua Brennan, made his first screen appearance on 22 January 2013. The character and casting was announced on 14 January 2013. Courtney is an inmate at Crestview Correctional Centre, which Casey Braxton (Lincoln Younes) has to attend for his part in a failed robbery. Casey's efforts to try to keep to himself fail when Courtney notices him and they have a "run-in". Younes described Courtney as being a "stereotypical prison bully." When Casey is placed in the prison kitchens, Courtney asks him to keep an eye on some food delivery that contain drugs. When Casey stands up to Courtney and refuses, he is left "battered and bruised" by the encounter.

Courtney takes a dislike to Casey and begins to make his stay difficult. He orders Casey to help with drug smuggling and attacks him when he refuses. When Jamie Sharpe (Hugo Johnstone-Burt) arrives at the facility, Courtney learns of the Braxton's animosity with the Sharpe family. He uses his gang to intimidate Jamie into attacking Casey. Zac MacGuire (Charlie Clausen) breaks up the fight. When Casey learns Courtney has asked Jamie to run drugs for him, Casey begs Jamie to say no and stand up for himself. Courtney manages to get Jamie alone and attacks him. When Casey tries to help Jamie, Courtney stabs Casey with a shiv. Zac manages to arrange a deal in which Casey is released and Jamie is transferred to another prison in return for them giving evidence against Courtney.

Maddy Osborne

Madeline "Maddy" Osborne, played by Kassandra Clementi, made her first screen appearance on 24 January 2013. The character was first seen during an official promo for the 2013 season. Clementi's casting was announced on 6 January 2013. The actress revealed that she was homesick for Australia and thought it was "a wonderful opportunity" to join Home and Away. Maddy was a teen runaway, who arrived in the Bay with Spencer Harrington (Andrew Morley). The character's introduction comes after producers announced that they would feature more fostering storylines in the show. Clementi described Maddy as being "an energetic and very loving young girl who is mature and wise beyond her 16 years."

Spencer Harrington

Spencer Harrington, played by Andrew Morley, made his first screen appearance on 24 January 2013. The character was first seen during a promotional trailer for the serial's 2013 season. On 22 January, Home and Away released Morley's official cast shots. On 1 March 2015, it was announced that Morley had quit Home and Away after two years to pursue acting opportunities in the United States. Morley finished filming in late 2014. Spencer departed on 23 April 2015.

Spencer was a teen runaway, who arrived in Summer Bay with Maddy Osborne (Kassandra Clementi). They initially set up home in the local high school, but are discovered by Sasha Bezmel (Demi Harman). Clementi revealed that Maddy and Spencer are trying to cover up a secret and that they are scared of what their parents will do when they find out where they are. They later turn up at Roo Stewart (Georgie Parker) and Harvey Ryan's (Marcus Graham) home. It was also announced that new character, Chris (Johnny Ruffo), would be related to Maddy and Spencer and that he would create some drama for them. Maddy and Spencer's introductions came shortly after producers announced that they would feature more fostering storylines in the show. Describing his character, Morley said "Spencer is genuine, confident and a big charmer. He has a quality that turns heads and his positive attitude enlightens those around him. Spencer is a romantic, loyal and selfless man that puts the ones he cares for above and beyond himself."

Spencer and Maddy come to the Summer Bay Caravan Park to ask Roo Stewart for caravan. At The Diner, Spencer reveals that he cannot pay for their meal, but promises to come back with the money. He later works off his debt and tells Roo that his parents are dead. Spencer and Maddy spend the night on a boat, before moving to the local high school. Spencer becomes concerned when Maddy gets sick. When they learn that Roo knows they are staying at the school, Spencer and Maddy initially disagree about contacting her. However, Maddy's health deteriorates and Spencer calls Roo. She and Harvey bring them back to Summer Bay House for the night. Spencer and Maddy later run away, but struggle out in the bush. They return to the caravan park and discover an injured Romeo Smith (Luke Mitchell) in the shed. Maddy fetches Roo to help and she and Spencer later decide that they can trust Roo. Spencer is given a job in the bait shop and Maddy reveals that they are not brother and sister, but lovers. Spencer's brother Chris (Johnny Rufflo) turns up in Summer Bay and becomes a third wheel in their relationship. Spencer and Maddy eventually break up.

Spencer gets into a relationship with Sasha Bezmel (Demi Harman), and Maddy is jealous. They have sex within weeks of becoming a couple, further infuriating Maddy. Chris returns to the Bay to try and win Sasha's sister Indi Walker (Samara Weaving) back, and he argues with Sasha, trapping Spencer in the middle again.

Rosie Prichard

Rosie Prichard, played by Teri Haddy, made her first screen appearance on 30 January 2013. The character and casting was announced on 13 January 2013. Shortly after she relocated to Sydney in May 2012, Haddy won the role of Rosie. She is six years older than her character, who is sixteen upon her entrance. Haddy called her character "sweet, but awkward" and noted that she is a bit of "a loner". Rosie has always lived in Summer Bay, but has never been seen on-screen before. She looks up to Sasha Bezmel (Demi Harman) and when they eventually become friends, Sasha invites her to a party. Haddy revealed "Rosie hears she used to be with Casey and gets excited because, to her, he's like royalty in Summer Bay." 
 In early April, Rosie was raped by fellow student Alexander Mullens (Louis McIntosh). Haddy explained "It's Rosie's first boyfriend and because he paid her all this attention and she felt really special, at first she doesn't see it as him attacking her. They were spending time together kissing, so she feels like she brought this on herself." Rosie goes to Sasha and Roo Stewart (Georgie Parker) and tells them what has happened to her. She also goes to the police to report Mullens. Haddy told Erin Miller from TV Week that she did research into how teenage girls have coped with being sexually assaulted. She also hoped the storyline would show girls that they do not have to be afraid to say no to what the guy is asking.

Rosie and Sasha Bezmel pair up for a science assignment. Sasha tries to get Rosie to touch a crab at the pier, but she becomes scared and falls into the sea. Sasha then jumps in to help her and they become friends. Rosie is invited to a toga party at Sasha's home and she is excited to meet Sasha's ex-boyfriend, Casey Braxton (Lincoln Younes). She later mistakes his kindness for flirting. Sasha notices Rosie talking to Natalie Davison (Catherine Mack) and presumes that Rosie has problems. She begins to question Rosie about her family. Rosie refuses to let Sasha stay over her house and pays Tilda Hogan (Gigi Perry) to pretend to be her younger sister Hannah. Sasha discovers Tilda's real identity from Jett James (Will McDonald) and she follows Rosie home, when she confronts her, Rosie reveals that her mum left her when she was young and her dad splits his time between her and his second family in the city, and Rosie lives on her own. When Sasha befriends Maddy Osborne (Kassandra Clementi), Rosie becomes jealous. She decides to run into the sea, despite not being able to swim well and Sasha has to run in and save her. However, both girls get caught in a rip and have to be saved by Casey and John Palmer (Shane Withington).

Sasha distances herself from Rosie, who befriends some other teens from the school. Rosie kisses Alexander Mullens and he brags about taking advantage of her. Sasha tries to get Rosie to stop hanging out with Mullens, but she refuses. While on a date, Mullens rapes Rosie and she initially blames herself for what has happened. Sasha supports Rosie, as she reports Mullens to the police. Rosie attends Zac MacGuire's (Charlie Clausen) self-defence classes and befriends Bella Lugrano (Hayley Mitchell-Miller), who later tells her that she was raped by Mullens too. The next day, Bella meets up with Rosie and Sasha at the Diner and tells them that she reported her rape to the police. One of Mullens's friends, Lachlan Stone (Michael Windeyer) stalks Rosie and scares her. At self-defence, she becomes frightened when Lachlan shows up and Maddy, Tamara and Sasha try to comfort her. Zac asks Lachlan to leave, but he explains that he just wants to talk to Rosie, as he has Mullens's text messages and videos of her rape. Rosie asks him to go to the police. A few days later, Mullens is arrested. While working at the Diner, Rosie collapses and soon learns that she is pregnant. Rosie briefly leaves school, as she feels unsafe, but she soon returns. Holly Chapman (Sacha Vivian-Riding) bullies Rosie about her pregnancy and her bond with Zac. Rosie decides to keep the baby and she later leaves the Bay to live in the city with her father.

Chris Harrington

Chris Harrington, played by Johnny Ruffo, made his first screen appearance on 1 April 2013. The character and Ruffo's casting was announced on 19 October 2012. Ruffo told Christine Sams from The Sydney Morning Herald that he had asked his agent to check out what roles were available, when the Home and Away part came up. After his first audition, he received a callback for a second audition. Ruffo called himself "very fortunate" after learning he had won the role because quite a few people also tried out for it. Home and Away marks Ruffo's acting debut and he relocated from Perth to Sydney for filming. He was initially contracted to appear in about sixteen episodes and he began shooting his first scenes in September. Ruffo's contract was later extended. Of his casting, Ruffo stated "I'm thrilled to be joining Home and Away. The cast and crew have made me feel so welcome and can't wait for everyone to meet my character Chris next year." Chris is Spencer Harrington's (Andrew Morley) older brother. He comes to Summer Bay to visit Spencer and convince him to return home and sort things out with his family.

Ricky Sharpe

Erica "Ricky" Sharpe, played by Bonnie Sveen, made her first screen appearance on 2 April 2013. Sveen previously appeared in the small guest role of Hayley Doven in 2010. She told Tim Martain from The Mercury that she was "thrilled" to receive the ongoing role of Ricky. She explained "I wanted Ricky more than anything I've ever auditioned for. I often think of my Nan [a huge fan of the show]. Home and Away was often on the telly at her house...and now I'm a River Girl." Ricky is Adam Sharpe's (Martin Lynes) younger sister. Amy Mills from New Idea revealed that Ricky would arrive in Summer Bay to attend Heath Braxton's (Dan Ewing) engagement party. She also became a love interest for Heath's older brother, Brax (Stephen Peacocke), who she has known since he was a teenager. In 2014, Sveen won the Most Popular New Talent Logie Award for her portrayal of Ricky.

Josh Barrett

Joshua "Josh" Barrett played by Jackson Gallagher, made his first screen appearance on 27 August 2013. The character and Gallagher's casting was reported by Debbie Schipp from The Daily Telegraph on 3 August 2013. Gallagher admitted he was starstruck when he filmed a scene with long term cast member Ray Meagher (who plays Alf Stewart), adding "That was when it hit home." Josh was introduced to the show along with his brother Andy (Tai Hara). The characters first appeared in online webisodes, which explored their backgrounds. On 14 May 2016, Kerry Harvey of Stuff.co.nz reported that Gallagher would be leaving Home and Away. His character will depart following his confession about shooting Charlotte King (Erika Heynatz).

Andy Barrett

Andrew "Andy" Barrett, played by Tai Hara, made his first screen appearance on 28 August 2013. The character and Hara's casting was reported by Debbie Schipp from The Daily Telegraph on 3 August 2013. Of being cast in Home and Away, Hara commented "I thought how lucky I was. It's just a real privilege to be on a show that is so loved." Andy was introduced to the show along with his younger brother Josh (Jackson Gallagher). The characters first appeared in online webisodes, which explored their backgrounds. The Barretts were initially rivals of the Braxton brothers and Hara said "There is a lot of history behind both the families. I carry the secrets of what our whole relationship is with them."

Hannah Wilson

Hannah Wilson, played by Cassie Howarth, made her first screen appearance on 29 August 2013. The character and casting was announced in late August 2013. Hannah was described as being "a free spirit". Howarth called her character strong and determined. She also stated that Hannah would "fight fiercely for her family", but she has a fear of being alone and needs to be loved. Hannah comes to Summer Bay to ask Zac MacGuire (Charlie Clausen) for his help, when she believes their niece and nephew are being brainwashed by a cult that Zac's brother, Ethan (Matt Minto), has got them involved in. Howarth called the storyline "hard-hitting" and added that it was not a smooth transition to life in the Bay.

Ethan MacGuire

Ethan MacGuire, played by Matt Minto, made his first screen appearance on 2 September 2013. The character and casting was announced in late August 2013. Minto originally auditioned for another role with the serial, but was offered the part of Ethan instead. He began filming in April 2013. Ethan is Zac MacGuire's (Charlie Clausen) estranged brother. He has got himself and his teenage children Evelyn (Philippa Northeast) and Oscar (Jake Speer) involved in a cult and has moved them into the camp. When Zac comes to visit, Ethan greets him "warmly" and tries to pass the cult off as a group enlightenment camp. Zac eventually teams up with Ethan's sister-in-law Hannah (Cassie Howarth) to try to get the children out of the cult, but it proves difficult and Ethan is "hard to fight." The character has also been described as being "controlling". Carena Crawford from All About Soap branded the character "Evil Ethan". Ethan departed on 27 January 2014.

Following the death of his wife, Ethan moved his children, Oscar and Evelyn, to an enlightenment camp run by Murray Granger (Christopher Stollery), which turns out to be a cult. Ethan's late wife's sister Hannah visits the family and tries to get the twins to come live with her. She later turns to Ethan's brother, Zac, for help. Zac comes to the camp to visit Ethan and the twins. Ethan later catches Oscar contacting Zac and he is beaten. Zac returns, but Ethan and Evelyn warn him to stay away. He is then issued with an AVO on behalf of Ethan. Zac, along with Darryl (Steve Peacocke), Heath (Dan Ewing) and Kyle Braxton (Nic Westaway), manages to rescue the twins from the cult. Evelyn later returns to be with her father. When Spencer Harrington (Andrew Morley) is beaten, Evelyn pleads with Ethan to help her get Spencer to a hospital and away from the cult. Murray is arrested for assaulting Spencer and Ethan takes over the cult. During a music festival, he has Oscar and Evelyn kidnapped. When Kyle tries to intervene, he is hit over the head and Ethan takes Kyle with them. Oscar, Evelyn and Kyle are locked inside a shipping container. Ethan goes to the hospital to tell Hannah not to worry about the twins anymore. Shortly after, a bomb explodes, leaving Ethan badly injured. Hannah helps him, but he later goes into cardiac arrest and dies.

Evelyn MacGuire

Evelyn "Evie" MacGuire, played by Philippa Northeast, made her first screen appearance on 3 September 2013. The character and casting was announced in late August 2013. Evelyn is the niece of established character Zac MacGuire (Charlie Clausen) and the twin of Oscar MacGuire (Jake Speer). Oscar and Evelyn are introduced to the show when Zac visits them after he is told that their father, Ethan (Matt Minto), has got them involved in a cult. Evelyn was happy to be living at the camp, but her brother disliked it. Describing her character, Northeast stated "Evelyn believes strongly in the value of family, having lost her mother at an early age and witnessing her father try to deal with the repercussions. This, in turn, has strengthened the sibling bond she shares with Oscar, in whom she finds comfort and entertainment." She called Evelyn gentle, but said that she has "a sharp sense of humour" and will voice her feelings, especially is she feels that her opinions are not being heard.

Oscar MacGuire

Oscar MacGuire, played by Jake Speer, made his first screen appearance on 3 September 2013. The character and casting was announced in late August 2013. Speer successfully auditioned for the role of Oscar in early 2013. Of his casting, Speer said "It's pretty incredible now that I'm able to talk about it ... obviously my close friends and family knew. I've been on the show since April ... I didn't really know what to expect to start off with, but it's been fantastic." Oscar is the nephew of established character Zac MacGuire (Charlie Clausen) and the twin of Evelyn (Philippa Northeast). The twins were introduced along with their father, Ethan (Matt Minto), as part of a cult stroryline. Oscar was uncomfortable with his father's decision to move him and his sister into the cult's camp and he struggled to "maintain his individuality and survive."

Nate Cooper

Nathaniel "Nate" Cooper, played by Kyle Pryor, made his first screen appearance on 26 September 2013. The character and casting was announced on 8 September 2013. Pryor originally auditioned for the role of Andy Barrett, but Tai Hara was cast instead. However, the producers liked Pryor so much, that they asked him to return to try out for the part of Nate. Pryor had begun filming four months prior to his casting announcement. Of having to keep his role a secret, the actor admitted "It can be quite difficult not spilling the beans but it is a good exercise in self-control." Doctor Nathaniel Cooper takes a position at the Northern Districts Hospital, despite wanting to work at a bigger hospital in the city to further his "climb up the professional ladder, to a speciality and beyond."

Jade Montgomery

Jade Montgomery, played by Tasma Walton, made her first screen appearance on 16 October 2013. The character and Walton's casting was announced on 27 July 2013. Walton previously appeared in Home and Away as Rachel Watson in 1995. The actress accepted the offer to appear in the show again as it coincided with the premiere of a film that she features in, which was shown at the Sydney Film Festival. Walton commented "I try to get back for a couple of months at this time each year, and the timing was perfect." Debbie Schipp from The Daily Telegraph reported that Walton had begun shooting her scenes a couple of weeks before her casting announcement. Jade Montgomery is a teacher, who was on-screen for "over a couple of months", as her story led into the season finale for 2013. She departed on 29 January 2014.

Jade Montgomery is the headmistress of Mangrove River High and when it burns down in an arson attack she arrives in Summer Bay to negotiate the merger between her school and Summer Bay High. When she learns that Bianca Scott (Lisa Gormley) will continue to serve as head of Summer Bay throughout the merger, Montgomery is put out and does not believe Bianca will be able to handle the students. She also criticises Bianca's husband, Heath Braxton (Dan Ewing), a former pupil of hers, and clearly discriminates against him. When she does the same to Mangrove River High students including Matt Page (Alec Snow), Bianca disciplines her, and as a result Montgomery trashes her office, graffitis the word “slag” on her door, and frames Page for the crime. Bianca and several of her colleagues including Leah Patterson-Baker (Ada Nicodemou) suspect Montgomery of being behind several crimes committed at the school, and when they manage to get evidence of this from Matt, Montgomery is suspended. Wanting revenge against Bianca, she purchases a bomb and places it in Bianca's laptop bag to try and kill her. The bomb goes off at the Northern Districts Hospital, and results in the death of Ethan Macguire (Matt Minto). When Montgomery discovers what has happened, she panics and Heath realises that she was behind the explosion. She is subsequently arrested.

Matt Page

Matthew "Matt" Page, played by Alec Snow, made his first screen appearance on 21 October 2013. Snow was cast as Matt after attending an audition in early 2013. He told Nick Houghton from The Toowoomba Chronicle that he was nervous ahead of the audition and did not expect to win the role. However, he received a call back the next day and won the part. He then went to Sydney to shoot his scenes. Snow was initially contracted for a three-month stint. Of his casting, Snow said "It is an absolute privilege to be on Home and Away. It truly is an iconic show and I am very proud to be a part of it." Snow later signed a contract to stay with the show for three-years. Snow called his character a "troubled kid", who does not where he fits in. The actor added "He is a bit confused about life and definitely ruffles people's feathers in the Bay."

Phoebe Nicholson

Phoebe Nicholson, played by Isabella Giovinazzo, made her first screen appearance on 26 November 2013. The character and casting was announced on 24 November 2013. After relocating to Sydney in mid-2013, Giovinazzo successfully auditioned for the role of Phoebe. It is her first acting job. Of joining the show, the actress commented "It's been a lot of fun. I'm still figuring out what to do. Phoebe's been a really great person to start with. Just developing her character and rounding this woman has been wonderful and I've got a lot to play with because she's a little bit kooky." Phoebe arrives in Summer Bay after learning that her ex-boyfriend Kyle Braxton (Nic Westaway) is putting together a music festival. Phoebe is a singer and songwriter, who grew up with Kyle in Melbourne and was "brokenhearted" when he moved away. Phoebe was billed as being "a bright, attractive and boundlessly energetic young woman".

Others

References

External links
Characters and cast at the Official AU Home and Away website
Characters and cast at the Official UK Home and Away website
Characters and cast at the Internet Movie Database
Spencer Harrington at the Official AU Home and Away website

, 2013
, Home and Away